José Manuel Carrillo Rubio (born 10 November 1975) is a Mexican politician affiliated with the Institutional Revolutionary Party. He served as Deputy of the LIX Legislature of the Mexican Congress representing Jalisco, and previously served in the LVI Legislature of the Congress of Jalisco.

References

1975 births
Living people
Politicians from Jalisco
Institutional Revolutionary Party politicians
Members of the Congress of Jalisco
University of Guadalajara alumni
Panamerican University alumni
Deputies of the LIX Legislature of Mexico
Members of the Chamber of Deputies (Mexico) for Jalisco